is the 13th single by Japanese idol girl group Nogizaka46. It was released on October 28, 2015. It was number-one on the weekly Oricon Singles Chart, with 626,905 copies sold, becoming the best-selling single in Japan in October. It was the sixth best-selling single of 2015 in Japan according to the Oricon Yearly Singles Chart, with 686,539 copies sold. As of February 29, 2016 (issue date) it had sold 729,690 copies. It was also number-one on the Billboard Japan Hot 100.

Release 
This single was released in 5 versions. Type-A, Type-B, Type-C and a regular edition, Kokosake (Limited) Edition. The Japanese animated film The Anthem of the Heart has the title song of the single as its theme song. The coupling song Kanashimi no Wasurekata is used as a thema song for their first documentary film Kanashimi no Wasurekata Documentary of Nogizaka46.

The center position in the choreography for the title song is held by Nanase Nishino and Mai Shiraishi.

Track listing

Type-A

Type-B

Type-C

Regular and Kokosake (Limited) Edition

Participating members

Ima, Hanashitai Dareka Ga Iru
3rd Row: Reika Sakurai, Yumi Wakatsuki, Rina Ikoma, Sayuri Matsumura, Marika Itō, Sayuri Inoue

2nd Row: Asuka Saitō, Kazumi Takayama, Nanami Hashimoto, Erika Ikuta, Manatsu Akimoto, Minami Hoshino

1st Row: Misa Etō, Nanase Nishino, Mai Shiraishi, Mai Fukagawa

Chart and certifications

Weekly charts

Year-end charts

Certifications

References

Further reading

External links
 Discography  on Nogizaka46 Official Website
 
 Nogizaka46 Movie Digest on YouTube

2015 singles
2015 songs
Anime songs
Billboard Japan Hot 100 number-one singles
Japanese film songs
Japanese-language songs
Nogizaka46 songs
Oricon Weekly number-one singles
Songs written for animated films
Songs with lyrics by Yasushi Akimoto